Glochidion harveyanum  known as the buttonwood or Harvey's buttonwood is a shrub or small tree in the family Phyllanthaceae. It is found in tropical north eastern Australia and Papua New Guinea in drier rainforest areas, from coastal areas to 1,000 metres above sea level.

References

Flora of Queensland
harveyanum
Plants described in 1927
Flora of Papua New Guinea